Cerani may refer to:

 Cerani, Derventa, village in the municipality of Derventa, Bosnia and Herzegovina
 Cerani (mountain), mountain in Peru

See also

 Cerami